Shin Dong-hee (born September 28, 1985), better known by his stage name Shindong (lit. meaning: "prodigy"), is a South Korean rapper, singer, dancer, host, radio personality and video director. He is best known as a member of Super Junior and its subgroups Super Junior-T and Super Junior-H.

Career

Pre-debut
Shin Dong-hee was born in Suwon, Gyeonggi-do on September 28, 1985. Little is known about Shindong's personal life, and many thought he was an only child. He has a younger sister named Ahn Da Young. With a love for dancing, Shindong signed up for the 2002 Goyangsi Youth Dance contest and won grand prize. A year later, he joined the contest again and won gold. In 2004, Shindong joined the Mnet Epi Contest and won both the gold prize and popularity award. In 2005, Shindong signed up for the SM Best Youth Contest and won first place for Best Comedian, achieving the grand prize. He signed a contract with SM Entertainment and received lessons to further improve his dancing ability.

Months after joining the company, Shindong was put in the large all-boy rotational group Super Junior as a member of its first generation, Super Junior 05. He decided to use the stage name 'Shindong' as his birth name sounds similar to bandmate Donghae. 'Shindong' is derived from his surname and the first character of his birth name, meaning "child prodigy".

Super Junior

Shindong  officially debuted as part of 12-member project group Super Junior 05 on November 6, 2005, on SBS's music programme Popular Songs, performing their first single, "Twins (Knock Out)". Their debut album SuperJunior05 (Twins) was released a month later on December 5, and debuted at number three on the monthly MIAK K-pop album charts.

In March 2006, SM Entertainment began to recruit new members for the next Super Junior generation. However, plans changed and the company declared a halt in forming future Super Junior generations. Following the addition of thirteenth member Kyuhyun, the group dropped the suffix "05" and became officially credited as Super Junior. The re-polished group's first CD single "U" was released on June 7, 2006, which was their most successful single until the release of "Sorry, Sorry" in March 2009.

During his career with Super Junior, Shindong was put into two subgroups, smaller groups that are branched off of the larger Super Junior group. In February 2007, he was placed in the trot-singing Super Junior-T. A year later, he became a member of Super Junior-H.

On September 27, 2011, he along with Yesung and Eunhyuk filled in for bandmate Heechul, who enlisted for mandatory military service on September 1, during the performance on Music Bank and Show! Music Core of Kim Jang-hoon latest single, "Breakups are So Like Me". Heechul is featured in the song and starred in the music video, which was completed the day before he enlisted.

Solo activities

Hosting
In November 2005, following Super Junior 05's debut, Shindong became an emcee on Mnet's music program M! Countdown, alongside Leeteuk and Kangin. The trio hosted together until August 2007, when Kangin was replaced by Eunhyuk. The new trio's final day of hosting was on March 27, 2008.

Shindong is popularly known as an active emcee and radio host of MBC's BoBoBo Ai Joa and KMTV's Green Apple Sound, successfully establishing the image, "DJ Shindong." Shindong left Green Apple Sound to host MBC's Stop the Boring Time Radio with Kim Shin-young.

From 2009, Shindong, along with Eunhyuk and Leeteuk, had been regular guests on SBS's Strong Heart, where they hosted a special segment, Boom Academy, headed by entertainer Boom. On March 28, 2012, SM Entertainment announced Shindong's departure from the show. As of the April 10, 2012, broadcast, following the change in MCs and his departure, the show was re-vamped with Leeteuk and Eunhyuk,  Kim Hyo-jin, Jung Ju-ri and Yang Se-hyung, billed as the 'six-fixed guests'.

Acting

While Shindong had prior acting experiences as a comedian, his acting debut was in the Super Junior film Attack on the Pin-Up Boys, which premiered on July 26, 2007. In 2008, Shindong played a major supporting role in the mini television series Single Dad in Love and also participated in the drama's original soundtrack. He and radio partner Kim Shin-young appeared in an episode of popular MBC drama Queen of Housewives.

Personal life

2007 car wreck
On April 19, 2007, almost two months after Super Junior-T's release of their first single "Rokuko", Leeteuk and Kyuhyun became seriously injured in a car wreck, along with Shindong, Eunhyuk, and two managers, when returning home after a recording of the radio show Super Junior Kiss the Radio. While they were on the highway, the front left tire burst as the driver was switching lanes, and the van ran into the guard rail/median on the driver's side and skidded for about 30 metres. At some point, the momentum caused the van to flip over on its right side.

While Shindong and Eunhyuk suffered minor injuries, Leeteuk and Kyuhyun sustained more serious injuries, which required both to be hospitalised. Leeteuk had glass shards embedded in his back and above his eyes, requiring over 170 stitches. Kyuhyun, who was sitting behind the driver's seat when the wreck occurred, was the most injured and had a fractured hip, pneumothorax from broken ribs, and facial scratches and bruises.

Military enlistment
On November 5, 2014, S.M. Entertainment announced that Shindong would enlist in the army on November 25, 2014. However, due to a back problem, his enlistment was delayed until a further date the next year. On March 24, 2015, Shindong quietly enlisted in the military without any fanfare or interviews with the press. He was scheduled to enter his service in Incheon. He was discharged from his military duty on December 23, 2016, after serving 21 months of active duty at the 55th army division's military band.

Health
On November 12, 2021, Shindong tested positive for COVID-19.

Relationship 
On January 1, 2023, it was confirmed that Shindong was dating a non-celebrity woman younger than him.

Discography

 Please (2011) with Leeteuk
 Marry Man (2017) with UV
 Cheer Man (2019) with UV

Filmography

Film

Television  series

Web series

Television shows

Web shows

Radio shows

Music videos

Appearance

Direction

Awards and nominations

References

External links

1985 births
Living people
Japanese-language singers of South Korea
South Korean male rappers
South Korean male idols
South Korean pop singers
South Korean male singers
South Korean rhythm and blues singers
South Korean male film actors
South Korean male television actors
South Korean music video directors
South Korean television presenters
South Korean radio presenters
Super Junior members
Super Junior-H members
Super Junior-T members
Melon Music Award winners